Candarave District is one of six districts of the province Candarave in Peru.

Geography 
Some of the highest mountains of the district are listed below:

See also 
 Pharaquta

References